Massimiliano Valcareggi (born February 12, 1995 in Trieste, Italy) is an alpine skier from Italy. He competed for Greece at the 2014 Winter Olympics in three alpine skiing events.

Although born in Italy, Valcareggi's mother is Greek, allowing him to compete for Greece. He chose to compete for Greece because he felt he had a better chance of making their national team.

References

External links
 
 
 

1995 births
Living people
Greek male alpine skiers
Alpine skiers at the 2014 Winter Olympics
Olympic alpine skiers of Greece
Sportspeople from Trieste
Alpine skiers at the 2012 Winter Youth Olympics